Detlefsen is a surname. Notable people with the surname include:
 Linda Detlefsen (born 1962), American middle distance runner
 Michael Detlefsen (1948–2019), American philosopher
 Paul Detlefsen (1899–1986), commercial artist
  (1880s–1963), Danish opera singer